CAT III may refer to:

Science and technology
 Chloramphenicol O-acetyltransferase, an enzyme
 CAT III, a measurement category of live electrical circuits
 CAT III, an instrument landing system category in aviation

Other uses
 Category III, in the Hong Kong motion picture rating system

See also
 List of Hong Kong Category III films